The 2022 OFC Women's Nations Cup Final was a football match on 30 July 2022 that took place at HFC Bank Stadium in Suva, Fiji, to determine the winner of 2022 OFC Women's Nations Cup. The match was between Papua New Guinea and hosts Fiji. 

For the Papua New Guinea women's national team, this encounter is their second appearance at an OFC Nations Cup final and their first since 2010, when they lost against New Zealand. Papua New Guinea have come second on two other occasions in round-robin format tournaments, most recently in 2014.

For the Fijian women's national team, this encounter is also their second appearance at an OFC Nations Cup final and second consecutive final after playing in the 2018 edition, when they lost against New Zealand.

Papua New Guinea won the final 2–1 for their first OFC Women's Nations Cup title. The win also meant they qualified for 2023 FIFA Women's World Cup inter-confederation play-offs.

Venue
The final was held at HFC Bank Stadium in Suva, Fiji, as all the other games in the tournament were. HFC Stadium was opened in 1951 and has since been renovated twice with the most recent of those two occasions being from 2012 to 2013. Owned by the Government of Suva City, HFC Stadium is the home of the men's Fiji team. The stadium hosted the 2015 OFC Champions League Final.

Route to the final

Papua New Guinea

Fiji

Match

Details

Statistics

Notes

References

External links

Final